Konaka (written: 小中) is a Japanese surname. Notable people with the surname include:

, Japanese writer
, Japanese table tennis player

See also
Konaka Station, a railway station in Midori, Gunma Prefecture, Japan
Konaka Museum, a museum in Vidin, Bulgaria

Japanese-language surnames